Rafael Maharramli (born on 1 October 1999) is an Azerbaijani footballer who plays as a midfielder for Keşla in the Azerbaijan Premier League and the Azerbaijan U21.

Club career
On 25 November 2017, Maharramli made his debut in the Azerbaijan Premier League for Keşla against Neftçi Baku.

He signed a contract with Qarabağ FK in summer 2018. On 20 August 2020, Keşla FK announced the signing of Maharramli on one-year long loan.

Honours
Keşla
 Azerbaijan Cup: 2017–18

References

External links
 

1999 births
Living people
Footballers from Baku
Association football midfielders
Azerbaijani footballers
Shamakhi FK players
Qarabağ FK players
Zira FK players
Azerbaijan Premier League players
Azerbaijan under-21 international footballers
Azerbaijan youth international footballers